St Michael is a civil parish part of the City and District of St Albans in Hertfordshire, England. The population in 2001 was 494. The local council is St Michael Parish Council.

History
St Michael was an ancient parish. The parish church was St Michael's Church in St Albans. Part of the parish was within the Municipal Borough of St Albans until 1894, when it was split to create St Michael Urban in the borough and St Michael Rural outside. St Michael Rural became part of St Albans Rural District.

Parts of St Michael Rural were transferred to the borough of St Albans in 1913 (138 acres) and 1935 (890 acres).

On 1 April 1974 the parish of St Michael Rural was split with part going to the unparished area in Dacorum and the rest becoming the parish of St Michael in the City of St Albans district.

Geography
It comprises a wholly rural area to the west of St Albans and is bounded on its western side by Hemel Hempstead. The parish is bisected by the M1 motorway.

Settlement is dispersed across a number of small and isolated hamlets:
Appspond
Breakspears
Bushwood
Childwickbury
Gorhambury
Potters Crouch

References

Civil parishes in Hertfordshire
City of St Albans
History of St Albans